The 1983 Syracuse Orangemen football team represented Syracuse University during the 1983 NCAA Division I-A football season. The team was led by third-year head coach Dick MacPherson and played their home games in the Carrier Dome in Syracuse, New York. Syracuse finished the regular season with a 6–5 record, but were not invited a bowl game.

Schedule

NFL Draft
Mike Charles (DT) was selected by Miami Dolphins in second round (55th overall).

References

Syracuse
Syracuse Orange football seasons
Syracuse Orangemen football